Leeco is an unincorporated community in Lee County, Kentucky, United States. It is named as a concatenation of Lee Co(unty).

References

Unincorporated communities in Lee County, Kentucky
Unincorporated communities in Kentucky